The Tin Scratchers: The Story of Tin Mining in the Far North is a 1959 autobiographical book by Ion Idriess. 

The book is an account of Idriess' attempts at making a fortune mining in the Cape York Peninsula and how he became involved in tin mining.  "From his own memories, Idriess provides accounts of the outback characters who were individuals to a man."

Reviews
In The Sydney Morning Herald, the reviewer noted: "That tireless narrator of frontierland tales, Ion Idriess, is still able to find vivid sources of reading interest in the remote outback." They went on that the novel "begins a little uneasily – due, one suspects, to some rather improbable conversations between the characters – but once it settles down to relate Mr Idriess' practical experiences it becomes increasingly interesting."

References

External links
The Tin Scratchers at AustLit

1959 non-fiction books
Australian autobiographies
Books by Ion Idriess
Angus & Robertson books